"Kissing a Fool" is a song written and performed by George Michael and released by Columbia Records in 1988.

A ballad with minimal instrumentation and a jazz feel, the song was written about Michael's insecurities as a soulmate and partner because of the baggage and reputation with which he came. According to Michael, the vocals were recorded in a cappella in one take. "Kissing a Fool" was the working-title for the album, which later was renamed to Faith.

Aside from Michael's vocals, the song employs piano, guitar, bass, drums, and a brass section. It was the seventh and final single to be released from the album Faith. It was also the least successful, making number 18 on the UK Singles Chart and becoming the first single in five not to make number one on the Billboard Hot 100 in the US. However, it reached number one on the Hot Adult Contemporary Tracks and became a number 5 hit on the Billboard Hot 100, remaining a fan favourite and being regarded critically as one of his most accessible and honest recordings.

"Kissing a Fool" was Michael's last single for almost two years in the United Kingdom. It was later covered by Michael Bublé on his self-titled album and released as a single in the United States and reached number 29 on the Billboard Adult Contemporary chart.

Writing

According to an interview published in the December 1987 issue of International Musician and Recording World magazine, Michael remembers writing "Kissing A Fool" en route to Japan for Wham!'s 1984 tour (referring to The Big Tour) in early 1985.  However, much like other songs Michael was writing at the time, it couldn't be used for Wham! due to certain restrictions in the duo's image; a solo album would be the best chance to use it (which, in that case, turned out to be the Faith album more than two years later).

Michael elaborates on the writing of "Kissing A Fool":

Track listing

7": UK / Epic EMU 7
 "Kissing a Fool" – 4:34
 "Kissing a Fool" [Instrumental] – 4:34

12": UK / Epic EMU T7
 "Kissing a Fool" – 4:34
 "Kissing a Fool" [Instrumental] – 4:34
 "A Last Request (I Want Your Sex Part III)" – 3:48

CD: UK / Epic CD EMU 7
 "Kissing a Fool" – 4:34
 "Kissing a Fool" [Instrumental] – 4:34
 "A Last Request (I Want Your Sex Part III)" – 3:48

Charts

Weekly charts
George Michael

Michael Buble

Year-end charts

References

External links
 
 

1987 songs
1988 singles
2003 singles
George Michael songs
Michael Bublé songs
Songs written by George Michael
Song recordings produced by George Michael
RPM Top Singles number-one singles
Sophisti-pop songs
Columbia Records singles
Pop ballads